Mitchell Shaw is an Australian-born rugby league footballer who last played for the West Wales Raiders in the Betfred League 1 competition. He primarily plays as a hooker. Mitch Shaw also previously played for Coventry Bears in the same competition.

References 

1998 births
Living people
Australian rugby league players
Coventry Bears players
Rugby league hookers
Rugby league players from Brisbane
South Wales Scorpions players